Mack Group is a privately held corporation providing contract manufacturing with specialties in plastics design, prototyping, molding, sheet metal fabrication and full product assembly.

Mack was founded in 1920 in Little Falls, N.J. Today, it is headquartered in Arlington, Vermont, and operates 11 locations throughout Vermont, Massachusetts, Connecticut, North Carolina, South Carolina, Florida, and Mexico, totaling  of manufacturing space. Mack Group employs over 3,000 and has revenues exceeding $500 million per year.

Divisions of Mack Group
The divisions within Mack Group include:

Mack Molding 
Supplies molded plastic parts, fabricated metal parts and high-level assemblies to the medical, commercial, computer & business equipment and transportation markets. Specialties include design, prototyping, custom injection molding, sheet metal fabrication and full product assembly, test and distribution. Six locations: Arlington, Vermont (2); Cavendish, Vermont; Pownal, Vermont; Inman, South Carolina; Statesville, North Carolina.

Mack Prototype 
Plastics prototyping with specialties in rapid prototyping, rapid tooling and low volume plastics molding. Located in Gardner, Massachusetts.

Mack Technologies 
Provides system assembly services for high-end electronic products. Specialties include design support, materials management, printed circuit board and final system assembly, product test and order fulfillment. Four locations: Westford, Massachusetts; Melbourne, Florida;  Juarez, Mexico.

Synectic Product Development 
Synectic product development is a full-service product design and development company focused on product design, research, prototyping, and manufacturing.

External links
www.mack.com - Mack Group corporate website
www.mackprototype.com - Mack Prototype corporate website
www.macktech.com - Mack Technologies corporate website
www.synectic.net - Synectic Product Development corporate website

Manufacturing companies based in Vermont
Arlington
Arlington, Vermont